Robert Frazier may refer to:
Robert Frazier (writer) (born 1951), American writer
Rob Frazier (born 1953), American Christian musician
Robert F. Frazier (born 1949), American politician from Pennsylvania
Robert Frazier (boxer), US Golden Globe light welterweight champion in 1992

See also
Robert Frazer (disambiguation)
Robert Fraser (disambiguation)